SPIN (Searchable Physics Information Notices) bibliographic database is an indexing and abstracting service produced by the American Institute of Physics (AIP). The content focus of SPIN is described as the most significant areas of physics research. This type of literature coverage spans the major physical science journals and magazines. Major conference proceedings that are reported by the American Institute of Physics, member societies, as well as affiliated organizations are also included as part of this database. References, or citations, provide access to more than 1.5 million articles as of 2010. SPIN  has no print counterpart.

Journals
Delivery of timely indexing and abstracting is for, what are deemed to be, the significant or important physics and astronomy journals from the United States, Russia, and the Ukraine. Citations for journal articles are derived from original publications of the AIP, which includes published translated works. At the same time, citations are included from member societies, and selectively chosen American journals. Citations become typically available online on the same date as the corresponding journal article.

Sources
Overall, the source citations are derived from material published by the AIP and member societies,  which are English-speaking, Russian, and Ukrainian journals and conference proceedings. Certain American physics-related articles are also sources of citations. About 60 journals have cover to cover indexing, and about 100 journals, overall, are indexed.

Scope
Subject coverage encompasses the following: 

Applied physics, Electromagnetic technology, Microelectronics 
Atomic physics and Molecular physics 
Biological physics and Medical physics 
Classical physics and Quantum physics 
Condensed matter physics 
Elementary particle physics 
General physics, Optics, Acoustics, and Fluid dynamics 
Geophysics, Astronomy, Astrophysics 
Materials science 
Nuclear physics 
Plasma physics 
Physical chemistry

See also
List of academic databases and search engines

References

External links
AIP'S SPIN Database Reaches One Million Records.  American Institute of Physics. March 1, 2002.
Can everything published in physics can be found in the arXiv?. The Scholarly Kitchen. Society for Scholarly Publishing. June, 2010.
AIP partnerships (society publishing). July 2010.

Bibliographic databases and indexes
Citation indices
Scientific databases